Physalis pubescens is a species of flowering plant in the nightshade family known by many common names, including husk tomato, low ground-cherry and hairy groundcherry in English, and muyaca and capulí in Spanish. It is native to the Americas, including the southern half of the United States, Mexico, Central and much of South America. It can be found elsewhere as an introduced species and sometimes a weed. It can grow in many types of habitat, including disturbed areas. The flowers blooming from the leaf axils are bell-shaped and about a centimeter long. They are yellow with five dark spots in the throats, and have five stamens tipped with blue anthers.

Cultivation and Use
The fruits can be harvested and ripened for a few weeks to be made into pie or jelly; unripe fruits and green parts of the plant are somewhat poisonous.

Members of the Toba-Pilagá culture of Gran Chaco consume the fruit raw. Toba-Pilagá children burst the fruits of Physalis pubescens var. hygrophila (Mart.) Dunal when they are covered by the inflated calyx by placing it on the palm of the hand and striking it with the other hand, in order to make noises as part of games.

References

External links
Jepson Manual Treatment
Missouri Plants Photo Profile

pubescens
Edible fruits
Flora of South America
Flora of North America
Plants described in 1753
Taxa named by Carl Linnaeus